Seaton railway station was a station serving the villages of Seaton, Rutland, and Harringworth, Northamptonshire.

History
It was originally a minor intermediate station on the London and North Western Railway single track Rugby and Stamford Railway line, which opened in 1850. In 1873 it became a junction when the LNWR double tracked the line from Rugby to Seaton and opened a new double track line thence to Wansford. Rugby to Peterborough was then operated as the main line and Seaton to Stamford as a branch line. In 1894 the branch line to Uppingham was opened.

Midland Railway
The Midland Railway Kettering to Manton line passes over the Welland Viaduct a third of a mile to the east, and slightly to the north thereof, passed over the Peterborough and Stamford lines and the Uppingham twice. There was never a connection. The nearest station on the Midland was 1 mile away at Harringworth.

Closure
The Uppingham branch closed to passengers in 1960, and the Rugby to Peterborough line and Stamford branch in 1966. The Great Northern Railway operated a service between Peterborough North and Leicester Belgrave Road between 1883 and 1916, when the service was withdrawn as a war economy.
Today the station site is a private home and scrapyard and the station building itself is now at least in part a private residence.

Sample Train Timetable for April 1910
The table below shows the train departures from Seaton on weekdays in April 1910.

References

Disused railway stations in Rutland
Railway stations in Great Britain opened in 1851
Railway stations in Great Britain closed in 1966
Former London and North Western Railway stations
Beeching closures in England
1851 establishments in England